The Haynes House is a historic house in Decherd, Tennessee, U.S..

History
The house was built in 1912 for Jonathan L. Haynes Jr, a merchant. It was built on the site of a former house-turned-school, Terrill College later known as Franklin County High School. Haynes was a co-founder and director of the Citizens Bank and Trust Company, and a vice president of the First National Bank of Franklin County. His son, Walter M. Haynes, also known as Pete Haynes, served as a member of the Tennessee House of Representatives and the Tennessee Senate. The house remained in the Haynes family until 2001.

Architectural significance
The house was designed in the American Foursquare architectural style. It has been listed on the National Register of Historic Places since April 28, 2005.

References

National Register of Historic Places in Franklin County, Tennessee
Houses completed in 1912
American Foursquare architecture in Tennessee